The 2007 SunTrust Indy Challenge was a race in the 2007 IRL IndyCar Series, held at Richmond International Raceway. It was held over 28 -June 30, 2007, as the ninth round of the seventeen-race calendar. It was the third of four night races on the 2007 calendar.

Classification

Note
Milka Duno was for the second race in a row parked by race officials for failing to meet the minimum speed.

Caution Periods
There were four caution periods during the race, with a total of thirty-three laps run under yellow.

References
IndyCar Series 

SunTrust Indy Challenge
SunTrust Indy Challenge
SunTrust Indy Challenge
SunTrust Indy Challenge